Craig Taylor James (born May 5, 1941) is an American politician and lawyer from Florida. He served two terms in the United States Congress representing Florida's 4th Congressional district from 1989 to 1993.

Early life and career
James was born in Augusta, Richmond County, Georgia on May 5, 1941. He graduated from DeLand High School in DeLand, Florida in 1959. He graduated from the University of Florida with an Associate of Arts in 1961. He graduated from Stetson University with a Bachelor of Science in 1963 and Juris Doctor in 1967.

From 1963 to 1969 he served in United States Army National Guard and United States Army Reserve.

He practiced law in DeLand from 1967 to 1971. From 1971 to 1975 he served as Commissioner of the DeLand Housing Authority.

Congress
From 1989 to 1993, as a Republican he represented the Florida's 4th congressional district in Congress. He did not seek reelection and continued to practice law in DeLand.

Later career
Currently he resides in DeLand, Florida. He is a partner and founding member of James & Zimmerman, P.L. in DeLand.

References

External links
Official bio

 

1941 births
Living people
Florida lawyers
People from DeLand, Florida
Politicians from Augusta, Georgia
Republican Party members of the United States House of Representatives from Florida
Stetson University College of Law alumni
United States Army reservists
University of Florida alumni